Axis & Allies is a series of World War II strategy board games. The first version was initially published in 1981 and a second edition known colloquially as Axis & Allies: Classic was published in 1984. Played on a board depicting a Spring 1942 political map of Earth divided by territories, players take the role of one or more of the five major belligerents of World War II: the Axis powers of Germany and Japan; and the Allied powers of the Soviet Union, the United Kingdom, and the United States. Turn rotates among these belligerents, who control armies of playing pieces with which they attempt to capture enemy territories, with results determined by dice rolls.

More than ten spinoff games have since been produced. Some of these editions are revised versions of the classic game, while others depict a specific theater, campaign or battle of World War II.

Game development
Axis & Allies was designed by Larry Harris under the prototype name 1942 in the late 1970s. Harris partnered with a local Connecticut hobby shop, Citadel Game Store, to publish Axis & Allies in 1981 under the company name of Nova Game Designs, with the name originating from Pat Flory, the owner of the shop. The game was republished by the Milton Bradley Company in 1984 as part of the Gamemaster Series of board games. This edition has been retroactively named Axis & Allies: Classic to differentiate it from later revisions. In 1996, Axis & Allies: Classic was inducted into the Academy of Adventure Gaming Arts & Design Adventure Gaming Hall of Fame. Games magazine also has inducted Axis & Allies into their buyers' guide Hall of Fame, an honor the magazine extends to "games that have met or exceeded the highest standards of quality and play value and have been continuously in production for at least 10 years; i.e., classics." Axis & Allies: Classic was the most successful of the five Gamemaster Series of board games. Long after the Gamemaster name was retired, A&A: Classic lives on having been moved to the Avalon Hill lineup following the acquisition of Milton Bradley Company and Avalon Hill by Hasbro. The game itself has gone through several revisions, most recently in 2018. The object of the game and its spinoffs is to win the war by capturing enough critical territories to gain the advantage over the enemy in a recreation of World War II.

After acquiring Milton Bradley (1984) and Avalon Hill (1998), Hasbro transferred the Axis & Allies: Classic (1984) board game from the Milton Bradley division to the Avalon Hill division in 1999. In 1999, Hasbro acquired Wizards of the Coast. In 2004, Hasbro made Avalon Hill a subsidiary of Wizards of the Coast (WotC).

The Axis & Allies (1981–present) board game series is currently produced by WotC under the Avalon Hill label. Hasbro is the parent company. There are a total of 15 board games in the Axis & Allies series (not counting second editions), 5 of which are currently supported by Avalon Hill. These are, Axis & Allies: 1941, Axis & Allies: Europe 1940 2nd Edition, Axis & Allies: Pacific 1940 2nd Edition, Axis & Allies: Spring 1942 2nd Edition, and Axis & Allies & Zombies. Many out-of-print A&A board games can be found on various auction websites.

Gameplay

In almost every edition of Axis & Allies, players play as the major belligerents of World War II: Germany, Japan, the Soviet Union, the United Kingdom, and the United States. The A&A: 50th Anniversary Edition also includes Italy as the third Axis power and China as the fourth Allied power. The A&A: Pacific 1940 edition includes China and ANZAC (Australia and New Zealand armed forces). The A&A: Europe 1940 edition includes Italy and France. The players playing the Axis powers team up against those of the Allied powers usually in an attempt to conquer key territories, represented by regions on the map board. In earlier editions, this was done by capturing and holding until the end of a round of play certain territories where the opposing alliance's capital cities are located. In later editions, this also included other territories on the map, where "victory cities" are located. 

Certain versions of Axis & Allies have their own custom victory conditions. In the original Milton Bradley edition, A&A: Classic, the Axis powers could also win by capturing and holding until the end of a round of play enough territories to gain an economic advantage. This "economic victory" was dropped in later editions of A&A. In Axis & Allies: Pacific, Japan gains a point for every 10 IPCs they collect and can win the game if they collect 22 points. In Axis & Allies: D-Day the Allies need to control the three cities of Cherbourg, Caen, and Saint-Lo at the end of the 10th round, in Axis & Allies: Guadalcanal, victory is achieved by controlling airfields, and in Axis & Allies: Battle of the Bulge the Germans need to control territories totaling up to 24 points before round 8.

Each round of a game involves each of the powers moving in turn according to a specified order; the game ends when either the Axis powers or the Allied powers complete their objectives. When each power takes its turn, they must first declare how they are to spend the IPCs (Industrial Production Certificates, an abstract currency representing one million man-hours of labor) in their possession: this may go into buying new units, improving units through research, or repairing damaged structures (in later editions). Players then declare any movements made that would result in combat, moving their pieces as appropriate, and after resolving combat, declaring any non-combat movements. At the end of the turn, players then place any units that were purchased at the beginning of the turn and collect IPCs based on all territories that they control at the end of their turn.

Combat is typically divided into several types; in all types, however, combat is divided into rounds. In each round, attackers and defenders roll dice to determine which of their units deal hits on the opposing side. If the number rolled is less than or equal to the unit's attack or defense rating (where appropriate), the unit scores a hit on an opposing unit of the opponent's choosing. During the round if an attacker defeats an enemy, the enemy can do a final retaliation before death, then be taken off the board. Some types of combat, such as strategic bombing raids, naval bombardment, and anti-aircraft defense, last only one round, though in others the attacker has the option of either continuing with another round of battle or retreating. Combat is fully resolved when either side loses all their units or the attackers choose to retreat. Though combat in different territories may be resolved in any order of the attackers choosing, combat in one territory may affect the number of combatants in another territory for later battles, as in the case of an amphibious assault or when attacking units withdraw.

Spinoffs
Due to the success of Axis & Allies: Classic, as of 2021, there are thirteen spin-off games in the A&A franchise using more or less the same mechanics. Four are updated or expanded versions of the original global A&A: Classic game. An additional four games are theater games depicting combat in Europe or the Pacific, three games are local games of specific battles, one game takes place at the beginning of World War One and one features a global theater with the addition of a zombie apocalypse.

Additional games have also been published by other game designers with similar mechanics (some requiring components from an Axis & Allies or similar game).

In 1999, Axis & Allies: Europe was released, with slightly updated rules and focus on the European theater of World War II; this was followed in 2001 by Axis & Allies: Pacific with similar rules and focus shifted to the Pacific theater. Axis & Allies: D-Day (2004) focused on the Allied liberation of France. In 2004, the first major revision to the core game, Axis & Allies: Revised was released, with elements taken from A&A: Europe and A&A: Pacific, also celebrating the 20th anniversary of Axis & Allies itself. Axis & Allies: Battle of the Bulge (2006) focused on the Battle of the Bulge in Europe while Axis & Allies: Guadalcanal (2007) focused on the Solomon Islands Campaign in the Pacific. In 2008, Axis & Allies: 50th Anniversary Edition was released as one of the three games celebrating the 50th anniversary of its publisher, Avalon Hill (the other two games were Acquire and Diplomacy). This was followed by Axis & Allies: 1942 in 2009, the second major revision to the core game, with mechanics taken from the anniversary edition, also celebrating the 25th anniversary of Axis & Allies itself. 

Axis & Allies: Pacific 1940 was released in December 2009 and Axis & Allies: Europe 1940 was released in August of 2010. These games can be combined  to form a Global game of World War II on a 175×80 cm (70" × 32") map. All nine major powers of World War II, China, France, Germany, Italy, Japan, the Soviet Union, the United Kingdom, the United States and the ANZAC forces, are represented in the combined global game with unique units and colors. To streamline the game and correct balance issues, Global 1940 was revised and a new rule set was released on the Axis & Allies forums in January 2011, later released as a second edition.

In 2012, Axis & Allies: 1941 was released, containing a simplified map and rules to make it easier for beginners. In 2013, Axis & Allies: 1914 was released, being the only non WWII centered Axis & Allies game. The most recent Axis & Allies game came out in October of 2018, Axis & Allies & Zombies, being an ahistorical version.

Axis & Allies is not a strict historical wargame, due to its streamlining for ease of play and balancing so that both sides have a chance to win. For instance, the economic model is simplistic, with each territory producing a number of Industrial Production Certificates (IPCs) for the purchase of new units. For example, in the original Classic version, the game is supposed to start in the spring of 1942, but Japan is immediately in position to attack Hawaii again, while Germany is pressed well into the Soviet Union with an initially superior force. If the game were truer to history, the Axis empires would be at their climax in 1942, about to be pushed back by the Allies.

Versions

Notes

Units

Revisions
Revisions would follow shortly after the game release as the rules didn't always produce results which made sense in the context of the historical setting. For example, the abstraction of submarines fighting airplanes, initially had a restriction that the bomber was the only kind that could attack a sub. This was later revised so that all aircraft could attack submarines.

Although not the very first edition, the Milton Bradley release was the first to establish the well known game mechanics. There were three versions of the rules for the Milton Bradley games, though only the first two were included with the game itself. The third edition rules were exclusive to a computer video game "Axis & Allies" by Hasbro released in 1998 and Axis & Allies: Iron Blitz with minor additional rules released in 1999. The three editions differed by minor details. There is also a newer video game, Axis & Allies: RTS released in 2004, a departure from the original A&A: Classic world map and introducing several tactical battle scenarios. The Axis & Allies: RTS (2004) was followed by Axis & Allies: RTS Collector's Edition (2006) with expanded strategy guide included.

The first major revision to the rules was designed by Larry Harris and Mike Selinker (who would later develop the board game Attack! based on the experiences learned working with Harris), who tried to address many of the Milton Bradley version's shortcomings, including removing the Axis economic victory condition and the requirement of capturing enemy capitals in favor of victory cities, which has been used in every revision since. With victory cities, the Axis and Allies start with an equal number of victory cities (specially labeled territories), and strive to capture enough victory cities to gain a majority of them (the size of the majority being agreed upon by the players prior to the game). This allows players to play shorter or longer games, depending upon the number of victory cities a power must control in order to claim victory.

With each revision, there were also balance changes in order to make gameplay more dynamic: in the Milton Bradley edition, infantry were cheap units that tended to be most useful as defensive cannon fodder, due to their token attack and slightly better defense. This had led to many areas of the game board being heavily fortified, bogging game play down to a matter of who could build more infantry faster. To counteract this, the tank, whose defense ability was equal to infantry in the Milton Bradley release, had its defensive capabilities improved in the revised edition, so as to encourage players to use combined arms. Other balance changes included altering the costs of the various units, and altering the transport capacity: in the Milton Bradley edition, transports could carry only two infantry or one of any other land unit; later revisions had transports able to carry one infantry in addition to one of any other land unit.

The variety of land and sea units was increased by introducing artillery and destroyers from A&A: Europe and A&A: Pacific to A&A: Revised edition. Artillery increased the effectiveness of infantry in attacks, while destroyers limited the usefulness of submarines and acted as a lower-cost substitute for the expensive battleship. Cruisers were introduced in A&A: 50th Anniversary Edition to effectively split the destroyer's many abilities. While destroyers continue to limit the usefulness of submarines, the stronger cruisers now act as lower cost battleships.

The game board itself was also reworked in each revision. The Milton Bradley classic release featured largely vibrant colors, while the revised version featured mainly darker tones. The 50th anniversary edition and 1942 edition has a more realistic terrain with only subtle hints of color to denote which power has initial control over a particular territory. The composition of territories was also slightly altered, for example, the number of territories between Berlin and Moscow had been increased for the revised edition, including adding many Soviet territories of strategic importance.

Strategic bombing was altered over the years. Until the revised edition, strategic bombing caused opposing players to lose the IPCs they had on hand. The 50th anniversary edition changed this so that industrial complexes were damaged instead. Damaged industrial complexes had less capacity to produce units and can be repaired at the cost of IPCs.

Later revisions have also included changes in research (which was generally not a worthwhile investment in the Milton Bradley edition due to its high cost and low probability of success) to have more of an effect, with mixed results, 1942 edition eliminates research altogether. Another feature that was implemented but was later dropped was the revised edition's "National Advantages", which represented tactics and technologies used by a specific power during the war. For example, a British ability allowed the British player to delay their combat movement until the American player's turn once per game, in order to have a coordinated attack.

Later editions had minor cosmetic changes in the playing pieces. In the Milton Bradley version, only the infantry pieces were unique to each power in appearance. Unique units was later expanded to include nearly every unit in later editions. Compared to the generic fighters of the Milton Bradley release, the Supermarine Spitfire was used in later editions to represent British fighters, the Mitsubishi A6M Zero was used to represent Japanese fighters, while two different fighters (the Grumman F4F Wildcat and the Lockheed P-38 Lightning) represented American fighters. The color scheme to associate units with powers was also standardized across all Axis & Allies series games, based on the colors used in A&A: Europe and A&A: Pacific, and is different from those used in the Milton Bradley release.

In 2009, an updated version of Axis & Allies: Pacific was released, titled Axis & Allies: Pacific 1940. The 10th board game in the A&A series, A&AP 1940 introduced the ANZAC forces as a playable power, along with two new unit types, mechanized infantry and tactical bombers.

In 2010, an updated version of Axis & Allies: Europe was released, titled Axis & Allies: Europe 1940. A&AE 1940 introduced France as a playable power. Mechanized infantry and tactical bomber units continue to appear after debuting in A&A Pac40. Italy also appears as a playable power in A&AE 1940 after debuting in A&A 50. In A&AE 1940 and A&AP 1940 aircraft carriers and battleships are capital ships that are damaged with 1 hit and sunk with 2 hits. Damaged CVs & BBs can be repaired by moving the damaged CV or BB to a friendly naval base for repairs. Special rules apply for fighters and tactical bombers if a CV is damaged. A&AE 1940 is the 11th A&A boardgame in the series. A&AE 1940 and A&AP 1940 are designed to be played as separate games or may be combined into one game to create a 2-6 player global 1940 scenario, complete with separate set up and national objectives. The combined A&AE 1940 and A&AP 1940 maps measure 175x80 cm (70" x 32"). All 9 major powers of World War II are represented with unique unit pieces and their own unique color.

Board games
In addition to designing the board games, Larry Harris had also designed A&A: Europe and A&A: Pacific, which had the core mechanics of Axis & Allies adapted for a specific theater. This, in turn, served as the catalyst for the revised edition. Although there were preliminary plans for a variant that allowed players to combine Europe and Pacific together, it had never been published. Larry Harris has announced two completely new editions, Axis & Allies Pacific 1940 released in December 2009 and Axis & Allies Europe 1940 released in Summer 2010, which will also include a variant that combines both games together.

Other Harris-designed Axis & Allies games were more tactical in nature, and focused on individual battles in specified, small areas: Axis & Allies: D-Day (2004) focused on the Allied liberation of France, Axis & Allies: Battle of the Bulge (2006) focused on the Battle of the Bulge, while Axis & Allies: Guadalcanal (2007) focused on the Solomon Islands Campaign. Though these games retained many of the traditional mechanics, some were specific to the particular game.

Reception
Warren Spector reviewed the 1984 Milton Bradley version of Axis & Allies in Space Gamer No. 72. Spector commented that "Overall, Axis & Allies is a winner. It's simple to learn, easy to play, requires lots of thought, and has immense replay value (since each country has unique goals, resources, and geography)."

In a retrospective review in Issue 4 of Simulacrum, Joe Scoleri noted, "Sometimes seen as the bane of 'serious' wargamers, this design has stood the test of time and the Milton Bradley re-release served to introduce a whole new generation to wargaming. While it won't please the Advanced Third Reich crowd, it is an entertaining game nonetheless."

Axis & Allies was declared the best-selling physical wargame in August 1996, having eclipsed the 275,000 copies sold by PanzerBlitz, the second-highest seller in the genre. It went on to sell roughly 1 million copies by 1998.

Video games
Two video games based on the official board game were released in 1998 and 2004. Axis & Allies by Hasbro released in 1998. It features a departure from the original A&A: Classic world map and introduces several tactical battlefield scenarios. Axis & Allies: Iron Blitz released as an updated version in 1999 with minor additional rules and features marines, paratroopers, destroyers, and kamikazes. Axis & Allies: RTS by TimeGate Studios released in 2004 and is primarily based on real-time strategy gameplay. Axis & Allies: RTS Collector's Edition released as an expanded version in 2006. The game became TimeGate's best-selling game.

In 2008, Wizards of the Coast created an online version of Axis & Allies as part of their Gleemax game site. When Gleemax was cancelled the game found its way to the GameTable Online game site, who programmed the game for Wizards of the Coast. The initial version was based on the 2004 Revised edition. In September 2010 GameTable Online has developed a new version based on the Axis & Allies: 1942 set.  Unfortunately, Game Table Online is no longer available, as it shut down in 2015.  Axis and Allies and many different variants can currently be played via the TripleA website.

TripleA is an open source adaptation of Axis & Allies, available for Windows, Mac, and Linux operating systems. It allows users to play single player against an AI, or hot-seat against other friends in the same room. It allows multiplayer on an online lobby, and also over email (PBEM) and network connections. Originally released in 2002, TripleA is now on stable version 2.2 as of year 2020.  Version 2.2 is able to play the major versions of Axis & Allies: Classic, Axis & Allies:Revised, Axis & Allies: 50th Anniversary Edition, Axis & Allies: Spring 1942. It also hosts many fan created maps, which have similar rules to Axis & Allies, but use a different setup or a different map or era altogether, for example, historical scenarios like a map based on Napoleon's conquests, Sci-Fi maps and Fantasy maps. 

In 2019, Axis & Allies 1942 Online was published by Beamdog.

Miniature games
In 2005, Axis & Allies Miniatures was released as the series' first foray into miniature gaming. This was followed up by Axis & Allies Naval Miniatures: War at Sea, with Axis & Allies Air Force Miniatures: Angels Twenty being released in October, 2011. There have been several additional A&A Miniatures booster releases. Currently there are 20 countries represented in A&A Miniatures.

Notes

 References 

 External links 
 
 Official website of Larry Harris Game Design, Creator of Axis & Allies''
Review in Games

Axis & Allies
Avalon Hill games
Board games introduced in 1981
Grand strategy board games
Hasbro franchises
Larry Harris (game designer) games
Milton Bradley Company games
Nova Game Designs games
Origins Award winners
World War II board wargames